Łukasz Podolski (born 21 May 1980) is a Polish former professional road cyclist. He most notably won the 2006 Tour du Sénégal.

Major results

2002
 1st Stage 7 Bałtyk–Karkonosze Tour
 5th Paris–Mantes-en-Yvelines
2003
 5th Memoriał Andrzeja Trochanowskiego
2004
 1st Memoriał Romana Siemińskiego
 3rd Miedzynarodowy 3-Majow Wyscig
 5th Overall Course de Solidarność et des Champions Olympiques
2005
 5th Szlakiem Walk Majora Hubala
2006
 1st Overall Tour du Sénégal
1st Prologue & Stages 2, 3, 6 & 9
 1st Stage 5 Dookoła Mazowsza
 4th Puchar Ministra Obrony Narodowej
 7th Szlakiem Walk Majora Hubala
 7th GP Kooperativa
2007
 1st Mountains classification, Course de Solidarność et des Champions Olympiques
 3rd Memoriał Andrzeja Trochanowskiego
 5th Tartu GP

References

External links

1980 births
Living people
Polish male cyclists
People from Skierniewice